, (born Yamaguchi, 24 November 1967) is a former Japanese rugby union player. He played as hooker.

Career
Originally from Yamaguchi Prefecture, Hirotsu was educated at Doshisha University, for whose team he played until 1989, when he joined Kobe Steel, with which he won seven All-Japan Championship titles. In the Japan national team, he was also part of the 1995 Rugby World Cup roster, but his only cap was during the defeat against Tonga for 16-47, in Nagoya, on 11 February 1995.

Notes

External links
Eiji Hirotsu international statistics

1967 births
Living people
Japanese rugby union players
Rugby union hookers
People from Yamaguchi Prefecture
Japan international rugby union players
Kobelco Kobe Steelers players